53311 Deucalion , provisional designation , is a trans-Neptunian object from the classical Kuiper belt, with a diameter of approximately , located in the outermost region of the Solar System. The cubewano belongs to the cold population and was discovered on 18 April 1999, by the Deep Ecliptic Survey at the Kitt Peak National Observatory in Arizona, United States. It was named after Deucalion, from Greek mythology.

Orbit and classification 

Deucalion orbits the Sun at a distance of 41.4–47.4 AU once every 295 years and 10 months (108,044 days; semi-major axis of 44.4 AU). Its orbit has an eccentricity of 0.07 and an inclination of 0° with respect to the ecliptic. The body's observation arc begins six days prior to its official discovery observation in April 1999.

It is a cubewano from the classical Kuiper belt, located in between the resonant plutino and twotino populations and has a low-eccentricity orbit. With its very small inclination (0.3°), significantly less than 4–7°, the object belongs to the cold population rather than the "stirred" hot population.

Naming 

This minor planet was named from Greek mythology after Deucalion, son of Prometheus. He and his wife Pyrrha were the only ones that survived the great deluge ("the flood of Deucalion") brought upon all humans by Zeus. The official  was published by the Minor Planet Center on 14 June 2003.

Physical characteristics 

Johnston's archive estimates a diameter of 212 kilometers based on an assumed albedo of 0.09, while American astronomer Michael Brown, calculates a diameter of 131 kilometers, using an estimated albedo of 0.20 and an absolute magnitude of 6.6.

On his website, Brown lists this object no longer as a dwarf planet candidate in his 5-class taxonomic system. As of 2018, no spectral type and color indices, nor a rotational lightcurve have been obtained from spectroscopic and photometric observations. The body's color, rotation period, pole and shape remain unknown.

References

External links 
 List of Transneptunian Objects, Minor Planet Center
 Dictionary of Minor Planet Names, Google books
 Discovery Circumstances: Numbered Minor Planets (50001)-(55000) – Minor Planet Center
 
 

053311
053311
Named minor planets
19990418